Boyds Creek is a  long 2nd order tributary to the Haw River, in Alamance County, North Carolina.

Course
Boyds Creek rises in a pond about 3 miles southeast of McCray in Alamance County, North Carolina and then flows southwest to the Haw River about 1 mile northwest of Haw River, North Carolina.

Watershed
Boyds Creek drains  of area, receives about 46.0 in/year of precipitation, and has a wetness index of 416.84 and is about 41% forested.

References

Rivers of North Carolina
Rivers of Alamance County, North Carolina